The Charles Applegate House is Yoncalla, Oregon. The house was built in 1852 and was added to the National Register of Historic Places on March 17, 1975. The building features a Classical Revival style and Stick/Eastlake style. It is one of Oregon's oldest surviving buildings.

See also
List of the oldest buildings in Oregon

References

		
National Register of Historic Places in Douglas County, Oregon
Buildings and structures completed in 1852